The 1992 Masters Tournament was the 56th Masters Tournament, held April 9–12 at Augusta National Golf Club in Augusta, Georgia.

Fred Couples won his only major championship, two strokes ahead of 49-year-old runner-up Raymond Floyd, the 1976 champion. He was the first American winner in five years at Augusta, the longest run at the Masters without a winner from the U.S.; the previous four were won by players from Europe, all from the United Kingdom. Though he had yet to win a major, Couples entered this Masters at age 32 as the world's top-ranked player and the odds-on favorite.

The 36-hole cut at 145 (+1) eliminated only twenty competitors and 63 played on the weekend, the most since 1966. The Masters did not have a cut until its 21st edition in 1957. George Archer, the 1969 champion, made the cut in his final Masters at age 52 and finished in 51st place.

Less than an hour after the leaders teed off on Saturday afternoon, thunderstorms caused a delay of nearly three hours. Six players did not finish the third round due to darkness, but the pairing just ahead, Ian Baker-Finch and Jeff Sluman, ran between their shots on the final two holes and completed the round. The three pairings returned early on Sunday morning to complete the round; Couples and Floyd were in the penultimate pairing and had four holes remaining. Early in the final round, Mark Calcavecchia shot a record 29 (−7) on the back nine with birdies at 10 and the final six holes; he finished ten strokes back.

Davis Love III won the 33rd Par 3 contest on Wednesday with a score of 22.

Course

Field
1. Masters champions
Tommy Aaron, George Archer, Seve Ballesteros (3,9), Gay Brewer, Ben Crenshaw (9), Nick Faldo (3,9,10), Raymond Floyd (9,10,11,12), Doug Ford, Bernhard Langer, Sandy Lyle (10), Larry Mize (9), Jack Nicklaus, Arnold Palmer, Gary Player, Craig Stadler (9,11,12,13), Tom Watson (9,10), Ian Woosnam (13), Fuzzy Zoeller (9,10)

Jack Burke Jr., Billy Casper, Charles Coody, Bob Goalby, Ben Hogan, Herman Keiser, Cary Middlecoff, Byron Nelson, Henry Picard, Gene Sarazen, Sam Snead, and Art Wall Jr. did not play.

2. U.S. Open champions (last five years)
Hale Irwin (9,10), Scott Simpson (9,10), Payne Stewart (4), Curtis Strange

3. The Open champions (last five years)
Mark Calcavecchia (9,12), Ian Baker-Finch (9,13)

4. PGA champions (last five years)
John Daly (13), Wayne Grady, Larry Nelson (10), Jeff Sluman (13)

5. U.S. Amateur champion and runner-up
Mitch Voges (a), Manny Zerman (a)

6. The Amateur champion
Gary Wolstenholme (a)

7. U.S. Amateur Public Links champion
David Berganio Jr. (a)

8. U.S. Mid-Amateur champion
Jim Stuart (a)

9. Top 24 players and ties from the 1991 Masters
Steve Elkington (12,13), Jim Gallagher Jr. (10,11,13), Peter Jacobsen, Andrew Magee (12,13), Billy Mayfair, Mark McCumber, Rocco Mediate (13), Jodie Mudd, Tsuneyuki Nakajima, José María Olazábal (10,12), Steve Pate (11,12,13), Corey Pavin (10,12,13), Lanny Wadkins (13)

10. Top 16 players and ties from the 1991 U.S. Open
Fred Couples (12,13), Nolan Henke (13), Davis Love III (12,13), Craig Parry, D. A. Weibring (12,13)

 Scott Hoch (13) did not play.

11. Top eight players and ties from 1991 PGA Championship
David Feherty, Bob Gilder, John Huston, Kenny Knox, Bruce Lietzke (13), Steven Richardson, Hal Sutton

12. Winners of PGA Tour events since the previous Masters
Fulton Allem, Billy Andrade (13), Chip Beck (13), Mark Brooks (13), Billy Ray Brown, Russ Cochran (13), John Cook (13), Brad Faxon, Bruce Fleisher, Mike Hulbert (13), Lee Janzen, Blaine McCallister, Mark O'Meara (13), David Peoples, Kenny Perry, Nick Price (13), Dillard Pruitt, Tom Purtzer (13)

13. Top 30 players from the 1991 PGA Tour money list
Paul Azinger, Jay Don Blake, Ted Schulz

14. Special foreign invitation
Rodger Davis, Colin Montgomerie, Greg Norman, Naomichi Ozaki

Round summaries

First round
Thursday, April 9, 1992

Larry Nelson, who scored 73, was disqualified after the first round for playing with non-conforming clubs. Nelson had played with irons which had a decorative design on the clubface. He reported himself, after being informed that they might be illegal.

Second round
Friday, April 10, 1992

Amateurs: Zerman (−3), Berganio Jr. (+3), Voges (+4), Wolstenholme (+7), Stuart (+14)

Third round
Saturday, April 11, 1992
Sunday, April 12, 1992

Final round
Sunday, April 12, 1992

Final leaderboard

Sources:

Scorecard

Cumulative tournament scores, relative to par
{|class="wikitable" span = 50 style="font-size:85%;
|-
|style="background: Red;" width=10|
|Eagle
|style="background: Pink;" width=10|
|Birdie
|style="background: PaleGreen;" width=10|
|Bogey
|style="background: Green;" width=10|
|Double bogey
|}

References

External links
Masters.com – Past winners and results
Augusta.com – 1992 Masters leaderboard and scorecards

1992
1992 in golf
1992 in American sports
1992 in sports in Georgia (U.S. state)
April 1992 sports events in the United States